The rufous-cheeked nightjar (Caprimulgus rufigena) is a species of nightjar in the family Caprimulgidae. It is an intra-African migrant that breeds in the south of its range. It spends the non-breeding season in eastern Nigeria, Cameroon, southern Chad and Sudan, the Republic of the Congo, the D.R.C. and western Central African Republic. During the southern hemisphere summer it is found in Angola, Botswana, Mozambique, Namibia, South Africa, Zambia and Zimbabwe.

Races
 C. r. rufigena – breeds mainly in South Africa, Zimbabwe and Zambia
 C. r. damarensis – breeds mainly in Botswana, Namibia and Angola

References

External links
 Rufous-cheeked nightjar - Species text in The Atlas of Southern African Birds.

rufous-cheeked nightjar
Birds of Southern Africa
rufous-cheeked nightjar
Taxonomy articles created by Polbot